Emmonsite, also known as durdenite, is an iron tellurite mineral with the formula: Fe2(TeO3)3·2(H2O).  Emmonsite forms triclinic crystals.  It is of a yellowish-green color, with a vitreous luster, and a hardness of 5 on the Moh scale.

Emmonsite was first described in 1885 for an occurrence in the Tombstone District, Cochise County, Arizona. It was named for the American geologist, Samuel Franklin Emmons, (1841–1911), of the United States Geological Survey.

Emmonsite is found, often with quartz or cerussite in the Tombstone, Arizona area.    It is also associated with native tellurium, tellurite, native gold, pyrite, rodalquilarite, mackayite, sonoraite, cuzticite and eztlite.

References

 Frost, Ray L. and Dickfos, Marilla J. and Keeffe, Eloise C. (2008) "Raman spectroscopic study of the tellurite minerals: emmonsite Fe23+Te34+O9.2H2O and zemannite Mg0.5[Zn2+Fe3+(TeO3)3]4.5H2O." Journal of Raman Spectroscopy, 39(12). pp. 1784–1788.  Found at Queensland University of Technology website; Accessed September 15, 2010.
 W. F. Hillebrand, "Emmonsite (?) from a new locality," American Journal of Science, Series 4 Vol. 18, December 1904, P.433-434; . Found at AJS Online; Accessed September 15, 2010.

Iron(III) minerals
Tellurite and selenite minerals
Triclinic minerals
Minerals in space group 2